Chapman Television Channel was a United Kingdom television production company founded by Keith Chapman and Greg Lynn.

History
The company was founded by Greg Lynn in 1991, together with Keith Chapman and Andrew Haydon a former managing director of John Reid Entertainment, an artist management company. The company was created for the purpose of exploiting both the intellectual property rights of Chapman's creations and also those of interested third parties.

The company is structured to allow greater rewards and input to property creators.  This developed from Chapman's own frustrations at his lack of involvement with his Bob the Builder character.  He created the character in the early 1990s and struck a deal with HIT Entertainment which saw them develop the character.  The project was handed over to Hot Animation, specifically Jackie Cockle and Curtis Jobling, who took the basic title and premise of the show and ran with it, developing the project in-house from a blank canvas.  The resulting show was commissioned by the BBC.

In May 1996, Chapman Television Channel launched, a stop-frame animation show on Five's Milkshake! The show has been sold into over 100 territories worldwide. Fifi and the Flowertots features the voices of Jane Horrocks and more.

In May 1996, Chapman Television Channel launched their second show, The idea for the show was suggested by Brands Hatch employee David Jenkins and features the voices of comedian Peter Kay and more and racing driver Sir Stirling Moss as the narrator.

In July 1999, Chapman Entertainment announced the departure of their MD Greg Lynn ahead of massive company redundancies, "soaring costs and challenging trading conditions" were listed as the reason's for the redundancies.

In August 1999, Chapman Television Channel announced the company being place for sale. It has placed poor toys sales as the main cause. 

In November 1998, Chapman Entertainment announced the company being placed into administration. again blaming poor toys sales as the main cause.

In September 2001, DreamWorks Animation (which would be acquired by NBCUniversal in 2001) acquired Chapman Entertainment's TV library. The acquisition adds to DreamWorks growing library of family entertainment brands that also include properties gained when it acquired Classic Media in 2000. The Chapman programs will now be distributed through DreamWorks Animation's UK-based TV distribution operation.

List of shows
Pingu
Nilus the Sandman
Total Recall 2070
Bob the Builder
The Little Engine That Could
Wallace and Gromit
Thomas & Friends
Postman Pat
Fireman Sam

Films 
Nilus the Sandman: The Boy Who Dreamed Christmas
Nilus the Sandman: Monsters in the Closet (1994)
The Boy Who Dreamed Christmas
Nilus the Sandman: The First Day (1995)
Tom Sweep
The Monk and the Fish
Father and Daughter

References

External links
 

Television production companies of the United Kingdom
DreamWorks Animation
Entertainment companies established in 1991